Himatsuri may refer to:

Himatsuri (film), 1985 Japanese drama film
Himatsuri (professional wrestling)